Jan Karel Bechyně (19 September 1920 – 9 March 1973) was a Czech entomologist and a leading authority on leaf beetles (Chrysomelidae). He was the son of photographer  and nephew of architect .

Career
Bechyně studied at the University of Prague, graduating in 1948 with a thesis titled "Příspěvek k poznání filogenese a zoogeography rodu Tymarcha Latr" (on the phylogeny and zoogeography of the genus Tymarcha Latr). He emigrated from the Czech Republic (then Czechoslovakia) in 1948 and never subsequently returned.

He worked in natural history museums in Munich and at the Museum of Natural Sciences in Brussels before moving to Los Angeles and later South America, where he researched in Brazil, San Salvador, and Peru before gaining a professorial post at the University of Maracay in Venezuela.

Bechyně was the first to propose combating the Colorado potato beetle with pests in Europe.

His wife, Bohumila Špringlová, shared his interest in entomology and continued to represent Jan at entomological conferences after his death.

Beetle Clinidium bechyneorum is named for Jan and B. Bechyne, noting that their "fine series of Clinidium have made the Rhysodine fauna of Venezuela the best known of any South American country."

References

1920 births
1973 deaths
Czechoslovak zoologists
Czech entomologists
Coleopterists
People from Přibyslav